This article lists '''political parties in Zimbabwe.

Active parties

Parties with parliamentary representation

Other parties 

[[NEW INNOVATIVE AND MODERNIZATION FRONT[NIMF]][TITLE=MUNYANDURI FORMS A NEW POLITICAL PARTY IN ZIMBABWE]
Zimbabwe African National Congress - A party modelled around the Socialist Democratic concept
A Road to Freedom Progress and Success (ARFPS)
African People's Congress
Democratic Assembly for Restoration and Empowerment
FreeZim Congress
Freedom Justice Coalition Zimbabwe Party
International Socialist Organisation
Labour, Economist and Afrikan Democrats (LEAD)
Liberal Democrats
Matabeleland Peoples Congress
Movement for People First
Mthwakazi Republic Party
National Alliance for Good Governance
National Patriotic Front
Patriotic Union of MaNdebeleland
Riseup Zimbabwe Freedom Party
United Parties
United People's Party
Youth Zimbabwe Freedom Party
Zimbabwe African National Union – Ndonga
Zimbabwe African People's Union (ZAPU)
Zimbabwe African People's Union – Federal Party
Zimbabwe First Party
Zimbabwe National Democratic Party
Zimbabwe Partnership for Prosperity - Kasiyamhuru
Zimbabwe Youth in Alliance
Zimbabwe Communist Party

Defunct parties

Zimbabwe 
Conservative Alliance of Zimbabwe (CAZ)
Forum Party (FPZ)
Patriotic Front (PF)
Republican Front (RF)
United African National Council (UANC)
Zimbabwe African National Union (ZANU)
Zimbabwe People's Democratic Party
Zimbabwe Unity Movement (ZUM)
Zimbabwe United People's Organisation (ZUPO)

Rhodesia
 Central Africa Party
 Centre Party (CP)
 Confederate Party
 Dominion Party
 Federal Party
 Mthwakazi United Party (MUP)
 Responsible Government Association (RGA)
 Rhodesian Action Party (RAP)
 Rhodesian Front (RF)
 Rhodesia Labour Party (RLP)
 Rhodesian White People's Party (RWPP)
 Southern Rhodesia African National Congress (SRANC)
 Southern Rhodesia Communist Party (SRCP)
 Southern Rhodesia Liberal Party (SRLP)
 United Federal Party (UFP)
 United National Federal Party (UNFP)
 United Rhodesia Party

References

Zimbabwe
 
Political parties
Political parties
Zimbabwe